Jaylen Bryce Clark (born October 13, 2001) is an American college basketball player for the UCLA Bruins of the Pac-12 Conference. A two-time Pac-12 All-Defensive Team selection, he earned second-team All-Pac-12 honors and was named the Pac-12 Defensive Player of the Year as a junior in 2023.

Early life
Clark was born in Riverside, California. His father, who played one season of basketball at Modesto Junior College, was a tough defender. Clark attended Centennial High School in Corona for three years before transferring to Etiwanda High in Rancho Cucamonga for his senior year. Under Etiwanda coach David Kleckner, a defensive specialist, he developed into a two-way player who played unselfishly. Clark averaged 18.5 points, 6.4 rebounds and 2.7 assists at Etiwanda, and led the Eagles to the CIF Southern Section Open Division regional finals. He signed a national letter of intent to play with UCLA in 2020.

College career
In his freshman year at the University of California, Los Angeles, in 2020–21, Clark was a reserve and averaged 2.5 points and 2.4 rebounds in nine minutes per game for the Bruins. He made the game-winning free throw in an 80–79 win over Arizona State at home in Pauley Pavilion. In the 2021 NCAA tournament, UCLA unexpectedly advanced to the Final Four. Clark helped lead a 14-point comeback in the First Four with a layup, a pair of assists, and an offensive rebound in an 86–80 overtime win over Michigan. He had a season-high nine rebounds in an overtime victory over Alabama in the Sweet Sixteen.

As a sophomore in 2021–22, Clark missed six games in January and February due to multiple concussions. Playing off the bench, he was named to the Pac-12 All-Defensive Team. He averaged 6.7 points and 3.8 rebounds in 18.1 minutes per game. In the nine games in which he played 20 or more minutes, Clark averaged 11.4 points and 5.6 rebounds. In February, during a three-game span versus Washington State, Washington, and Arizona State, he averaged 19.7 points, making 3 of 8 on 3-pointers, and added 8.3 rebounds and 2.7 steals. According to UCLA head coach Mick Cronin, "With consistent minutes, you’re going to see him produce a lot more on the offensive end".

Clark became a full-time starter in his junior year in 2022–23 after Johnny Juzang and Jules Bernard departed. In the Bruins' season opener, he scored 17 points on 7-of-7 shooting and had seven steals in a win over Sacramento State. In the regular season finale against Arizona, he injured his right foot and was ruled out for the 2023 Pac-12 tournament. The top-seeded Bruins advanced to the tournament finals, before losing 61–59 to No. 2-seed Arizona. UCLA, who was vying for a No. 1 seed in the 2023 NCAA tournament, received a No. 2 seed in the West Region, but Clark was ruled out for the season. He averaged 2.6 steals per game during the season, which led the Pac-12 and ranked fifth in the nation. One of the top defensive players in the country, he was a finalist for the Naismith Defensive Player of the Year Award and was named the Pac-12 Defensive Player of the Year. Selected again to the conference's all-defensive team, he was also voted second-team All-Pac-12. Clark significantly improved on offense and became UCLA's second-leading scorer. He nearly doubled his scoring from the previous season, averaging 13.0 points, 6.0 rebounds and 1.9 assists in 30.5 minutes over 30 games.

Career statistics

|-
| style="text-align:left;"| 2020–21
| style="text-align:left;"| UCLA
| 31 || 0 || 9.0 || .500 || .200 || .750 || 2.4 || .2 || .1 || .2 || 2.5
|-
| style="text-align:left;"| 2021–22
| style="text-align:left;"| UCLA
| 29 || 6 || 18.1 || .506 || .259 || .542 || 3.8 || 1.0 || 1.1 || .2 || 6.7
|-
| style="text-align:left;"| 2022–23
| style="text-align:left;"| UCLA
| 30 || 29 || 30.5 || .481 || .329 || .698 || 6.0 || 1.9 || 2.6 || .3 || 13.0
|-class="sortbottom"
| style="text-align:center;" colspan=2| Career
| 90 || 35 || 19.1 || .490 || .302 || .661 || 4.1 || 1.0 || 1.3 || .2 || 7.4

Source:

References

External links

UCLA Bruins bio

2001 births
Living people
American men's basketball players
Basketball players from Riverside, California
Shooting guards
UCLA Bruins men's basketball players